Bema myja is a species of snout moth in the genus Bema. It was described by Harrison Gray Dyar Jr. in 1914 and is found in Panama.

References

Phycitinae
Moths described in 1914